Jordan Alan Gross (born July 20, 1980) is a former American football offensive tackle for the Carolina Panthers of the National Football League (NFL). He played college football at Utah, where he was recognized as a consensus All-American. He spent his entire career with the Panthers, who drafted him eighth overall in the 2003 NFL Draft, and is now their sideline reporter.

Early years
Gross was born in Nampa, Idaho.  He attended Fruitland High School in Fruitland, Idaho, where he was a letterman in high school football, basketball, and track and field.  In football, he was a first-team all-state selection as both an offensive and defensive lineman as a senior, and helped lead his team win the conference championship as a sophomore.  In basketball, he won all-conference honors. He was involved in tae kwon do since age 6, earning a black belt.

College career
While attending the University of Utah, Gross played for the Utah Utes football team from 1999 to 2002.  After redshirting his freshman year, he started three games, and played in the Las Vegas Bowl, where the Mountain West Conference (MWC) champion Utes beat Fresno State by a score of 17–16.  The following season, he received honorable mention All-MWC honors after starting all 11 games, switching between offensive tackle and offensive guard.  His versatility increased as a junior, as he played left tackle, left guard, and right tackle, and finished the season once again as an honorable mention All-MWC selection.  His offensive line allowed only five sacks all season, which tied the University of Miami Hurricanes record for fewest allowed in the nation.  Gross himself did not allow any sacks in his final two seasons at Utah. Following his 2002 senior season, he was a first-team All-MWC selection, and was recognized as a consensus first-team All-American.  He was also a finalist for the Outland Trophy, which is given to the best interior lineman in college football, after not allowing a sack all season at left tackle.

Awards and honors
 2× Honorable mention All-Mountain West (2000, 2001)
 First-team All-Mountain West (2002)
 Consensus first-team All-American (2002)
 Outland Trophy finalist (2002)

Professional career

Projected as an early first round selection, Gross was ranked as the No. 1 offensive tackle available in the 2003 NFL Draft. He was taken in the first round (8th overall) of the 2003 NFL Draft by Carolina. At the time, he was the highest selected Utah Utes player ever (until surpassed by Alex Smith in 2005).

Gross started every game for the Panthers that season at right tackle, and in fact did not miss a single offensive play, a rarity for many veterans, much less rookies. He allowed only three sacks all season, and was an anchor on the offensive line that sent the Panthers to Super Bowl XXXVIII. He made the Pro Football Weekly All-Rookie and Sports Illustrated All-Pro teams that season. Due to retirements and personnel shifts, Gross moved from right tackle to left tackle for the 2004 NFL season; he and center Jeff Mitchell were the only two returning starters on the offensive line that season. The instability on the line was one of many problems for the Panthers, who were plagued with injuries, and they finished the season 7–9. The following year, he moved back to right tackle, and the Panthers' starters remained the same during the entire season. On February 19, 2008, the Panthers named Gross their franchise player and placed the franchise tag on him giving him a one-year $7.45 million deal. This later proved to be a good move, as he was voted to the 2009 Pro Bowl.  On February 19, 2009, the Panthers would sign Gross to a six-year contract, making him one of the highest-paid offensive lineman in the NFL. In a matchup against the Atlanta Falcons on November 15, 2009, Gross broke his ankle, landing him on the injured reserve list and ending his participation in the 2009 NFL Season.

On February 25, 2014, Gross announced his retirement from professional football. He now works for The Panthers Network as a sideline reporter and hosts his own Television broadcast with longtime offensive lineman Travelle Wharton entitled, "This is Gross," on Time Warner Cable Sports channel.

On July 9, 2019, the Carolina Panthers announced that Gross would be inducted into the Panthers' Hall of Honor along with Jake Delhomme, Wesley Walls, and Steve Smith Sr. On August 14, 2019, he was named to the Panthers' radio team as a color analyst.

References

External links
 Carolina Panthers bio
 This is Gross podcast

1980 births
Living people
All-American college football players
American football offensive tackles
Carolina Panthers players
National Conference Pro Bowl players
People from Fruitland, Idaho
Players of American football from Idaho
Unconferenced Pro Bowl players
Utah Utes football players
People from Nampa, Idaho
National Football League announcers
Carolina Panthers announcers
Ed Block Courage Award recipients